Udon Thani Football Club is a Thai professional football club based in Udon Thani province in north-eastern Thailand. The club was formed in 1999, and played their first competitive match in November the same year, when they entered the Provincial League.

Below is a list of footballers who have played for Udon Thani Football Club.

List of players

Appearances and goals are for first-team competitive matches only, including Regional League, Provincial League, Regional Champions League, FA Cup and League Cup matches.
Players are listed according to their last year at the club, so current players are listed on top.

Appearances correct from 2011 to match played 14 December 2014

Key to positions

References
สโมสรฟุตบอลจังหวัดอุดรธานี
โปรวินเชียลลีก
Online magazin für Thai fussball
Thai League Football
Thai League Online
Udon Thani FC Clubwebsite
 Official Facebookpage of Udon Thani FC
 Udon Thani FC in English
 Official UDFC fanclubpage on Facebook

Udon
List
Association football player non-biographical articles